The 267th Infantry Division was a German division in World War II.  It was formed on 26 August 1939 in Hanover. Called the 'Horsehead' division because of its emblem, after it was mobilised in August 1939 it was posted to the Westwall. It took part in the invasion of France in 1940, advancing through Belgium. From July 1940 to May 1941, it was responsible for guarding a part of the English Channel coast. In June 1941 it was a part of Operation Barbarossa, as part of Army Group Centre. It remained with this Army Group until it was encircled and destroyed in July 1944. Shortly afterwards it was officially dissolved.

Commanding officers
 General der Panzertruppe Ernst Feßmann, 26 August 1939 – 1 June 1941;
 Generalmajor Friedrich-Karl von Wachter, 1 June 1941 – 10 November 1941;
 General der Artillerie Robert Martinek, 10 November 1941 – 1 January 1942;
 Generalmajor Karl Fischer, 1 January 1942 – 24 January 1942;
 Generalleutnant Friedrich Stephan, 24 January 1942 – 26 February 1942;
 Generalmajor Karl Fischer, 26 February 1942 – 31 March 1942;
 Generalleutnant Friedrich Stephan, 31 March 1942 – 8 June 1943;
 Generalleutnant Otto Drescher, 8 June 1943 – 13 August 1944.

Notes

References

External links
 

Infantry divisions of Germany during World War II
Military units and formations established in 1939
1939 establishments in Germany
Military units and formations disestablished in 1944